The 2021–22 Hawaii Rainbow Wahine basketball team represented the University of Hawaiʻi at Mānoa during the 2021–22 NCAA Division I women's basketball season. The Rainbow Wahine, led by Laura Beeman in her 10th season as head coach, played their home games at SimpliFi Arena at Stan Sheriff Center in Honolulu  as a member of the Big West Conference.

The Rainbow Wahine finished the season with a 20–10 record, including a 13–3 mark in Big West conference play that netted them the regular season championship and the top overall seed in the Big West Conference tournament. The team won the conference tournament and the automatic bid to the NCAA tournament, where they lost to Baylor in the first round.

Previous season 

The Rainbow Wahine finished the 2020–21 season with an overall record of 9–8 (7–6 in Big West play), to finish fifth in the Big West conference standings. The team beat Cal State Bakersfield in the first round of the Big West Conference tournament 81–67 before losing to the eventual conference champions UC Davis in the semifinal round, 64–52.

Roster

Schedule and results 

|-
!colspan=9 style=| Exhibition

|-
!colspan=9 style=| Regular season

|-
!colspan=12 style=| Big West tournament

|-
!colspan=12 style=| NCAA tournament

|-

References 

Hawaii Rainbow Wahine basketball seasons
2021–22 Big West Conference women's basketball season
2021 in sports in Hawaii
2022 in sports in Hawaii
2022 NCAA Division I women's basketball tournament participants